is a Japanese Internet variety show broadcasting weeknights on AbemaTV's Anime Live Channel. The show features voice actors, who have appeared in various anime and video game series, participating in acting scenarios, quizzes, and talk segments. The show has been running since April 2018 and celebrated its 1,000th episode run in 2021.

As of 2021, the show is currently hosted by Hiroki Yasumoto and Tomoaki Maeno on Mondays; Hiro Shimono and Maaya Uchida on Tuesdays; Mikako Komatsu, Sumire Uesaka, and Aimi on Wednesdays; Daisuke Namikawa and Kaito Ishikawa on Thursdays; Tomokazu Seki and Tasuku Hatanaka on Fridays; and Showtaro Morikubo and Shugo Nakamura on the first weekend of every month. In addition, Subaru Kimura and Tomoko Kaneda host the mini program Say You to Yo Asobi: Connect every weeknight.

Recurring segments

Current

 : In Hiro Shimono and Maaya Uchida's segments, they would read and act lines from a specific scenario to a dummy head microphone.

Former

 : In Hiroki Yasumoto and Takuya Eguchi's segments, one of them would dub a 10-second video clip submitted by their viewers.

Production

Say You to Yo Asobi was first broadcast on April 2, 2018. The hosts were Megumi Ogata and Aya Uchida on Mondays; Yūki Ono and Yuka Ōtsubo on Tuesdays; Hiromi Igarashi and Shiori Mikami on Wednesdays; Daisuke Namikawa and Kishō Taniyama on Thursdays; and Tomokazu Seki and Takuya Satō on Fridays.

Say You to Yo Asobi was renewed for a second season, which began broadcast on April 8, 2019. The hosts were Hiroki Yasumoto and Takuya Eguchi on Mondays; Tomoko Kaneda and Subaru Kimura on Tuesdays; Hiro Shimono and Maaya Uchida on Wednesdays; Daisuke Namikawa on Thursdays; and Tomokazu Seki and Genki Okawa on Fridays. Namikawa, who hosted the show on Thursday evenings, had no fixed co-host until Takuya Satō returned to the show in September 2019. Prior to that, Namikawa's co-host rotated monthly, with Showtaro Morikubo co-hosting in April, Tsubasa Yonaga in May, Hiroyuki Yoshino in June, and Kaito Ishikawa in August.

Say You to Yo Asobi began its third season in April 2020. The hosts were Hiroki Yasumoto and Shugo Nakamura on Mondays; Hiro Shimono and Maaya Uchida on Tuesdays; Mikako Komatsu and Sumire Uesaka on Wednesdays; Daisuke Namikawa and Kaito Ishikawa on Thursdays; and Tomokazu Seki and Showtaro Morikubo on Fridays. In addition to its hosts, the main segments were shortened to 105 minutes to make room for a new 15-minute mini program titled Say You to Yo Asobi: Connect, hosted by Subaru Kimura and Tomoko Kaneda, that was broadcast every weeknight.

Say You to Yo Asobi began its fourth season on April 12, 2021. All hosts returned to reprise their segments, with the exception of Morikubo and Nakamura, who were moved to a "weekend" broadcast day that would be featured on the first weekend of every month. Tomoaki Maeno appeared as Yasumoto's new co-host on Mondays; Tasuku Hatanaka appeared as Seki's new co-host on Fridays; Sora Tokui co-hosted Wednesdays with Komatsu and Uesaka until July 2021, where she was later replaced by Aimi. A special episode hosted by the weekend hosts was broadcast on April 3, 2021. In June 2021, a collaboration project with the Japan Racing Association was broadcast, with a special video featuring the hosts making predictions about Takarazuka Kinen. Shimono was temporarily replaced by Yōko Hikasa and Hatanaka after testing positive for COVID-19 in July 2021.

Episodes

Season 4: 2021 (2021)

References

External links
 

Japanese variety television shows